Sleeping Rough in Port-au-Prince: An Ethnography of Street Children and Violence in Haiti is a 2006 book by American cultural anthropologist J. Christopher Kovats-Bernat. It was published by University Press of Florida. The book was the subject of scholarly reviews. In 2001, Kovats-Bernat wrote a dissertation at Temple University on street children in Port-au-Prince.

References

2006 non-fiction books
University Press of Florida books
Books about Haiti
Ethnographic literature